Chicago Ridge is a station on Metra's SouthWest Service in Chicago Ridge, Illinois. In Metra's zone-based fare system, Chicago Ridge is in zone D. As of 2018, Chicago Ridge is the 127th busiest of Metra's 236 non-downtown stations, with an average of 372 weekday boardings.

As of January 16, 2023, Chicago Ridge is served by 28 trains (14 in each direction) on weekdays. Saturday service is currently suspended.

The station is located just north of the Village Hall and Police Station on Ridgeland Avenue between Washington Avenue and 105th Street, and west of the B&OCT/IHB Railroad's crossing at grade and the Stony Creek Golf Course. Parking is available not only at the station, but behind the Police Station, along Birmingham Street, Oxford Avenue, and north of the tracks at the corner of Ridgeland Avenue and 103rd Street.

Bus connections

References

External links 

Station from Ridgeland Avenue from Google Maps Street View

Metra stations in Illinois
Railway stations in Cook County, Illinois
Railway stations in the United States opened in 1991
Former Wabash Railroad stations